Thomas Lyde Hornbrook (May 6, 1807 – August 17, 1855) was a British marine artist. He was the eldest son of Richards Lyde Hornbrook, who was an officer in the Royal Marines stationed in Plymouth. He exhibited in the Royal Academy (1836 and 1844) and around 1833 became marine painter to the Duchess of Kent and her daughter Victoria.

References 

19th-century British painters
British male painters
British marine artists
1850 deaths
Year of birth uncertain
1807 births
19th-century British male artists